Dagaari, also known as Balli Dagar Uen, is a town in the north-central Mudug region of Galmudug state of Somalia, located east of Banderadley.

A notable person from this town was General Abdiaziz Abdullahi (nicknamed Qooje Dagaari) who was the 21st division commander of the Somali National Army.

References

Balli Dagar Uen

Populated places in Mudug
Populated places in Somalia
Cities in Somalia
Galmudug